The 2004–05 season was the 99th season in the existence of AJ Auxerre and the club's 25th consecutive season in the top-flight of French football. In addition to the domestic league, Auxerre participated in this season's editions of the Coupe de France, the Coupe de la Ligue and UEFA Cup.

Season summary
Auxerre fell to 8th in the final table, but won the Coupe de France. Manager Guy Roux retired at the end of the season, after 36 years managing the club. He was replaced by Jacques Santini.

First-team squad
Squad at end of season

Left club during season

Transfers

Out
 Djibril Cissé - Liverpool, 1 July, £14,000,000

Competitions

Overall record

Ligue 1

League table

Results summary

Results by round

Matches

Coupe de France

Coupe de la Ligue

UEFA Cup

First round

Group stage

Round of 32

Round of 16

Quarter-finals

Notes and references

Notes

References

AJ Auxerre seasons
AJ Auxerre